The Rochelle Park Public School District is a community public school district that serves students in pre-kindergarten through eighth grade from Rochelle Park, in Bergen County, New Jersey, United States.

As of the 2018–19 school year, the district, comprising one school, had an enrollment of 511 students and 42.4 classroom teachers (on an FTE basis), for a student–teacher ratio of 12.1:1.

The district is classified by the New Jersey Department of Education as being in District Factor Group "FG", the fourth-highest of eight groupings. District Factor Groups organize districts statewide to allow comparison by common socioeconomic characteristics of the local districts. From lowest socioeconomic status to highest, the categories are A, B, CD, DE, FG, GH, I and J.

Students in public school for ninth through twelfth grades attend Hackensack High School in Hackensack, as part of a sending/receiving relationship with the Hackensack Public Schools, together with students from Maywood and South Hackensack. As of the 2018–19 school year, the high school had an enrollment of 1,959 students and 132.5 classroom teachers (on an FTE basis), for a student–teacher ratio of 14.8:1.

Schools
Midland School served 506 students in grades PreK-8 (as of the 2018–19 school year, per the National Center for Education Statistics)
Michael Alberta, Principal

Administration
Core members of the district's administration are:
Dr. Sue DeNobile, Superintendent
Cheryl Jiosi, Business Administrator / Board Secretary

Board of education
The district's board of education, comprised of seven members, sets policy and oversees the fiscal and educational operation of the district through its administration. As a Type II school district, the board's trustees are elected directly by voters to serve three-year terms of office on a staggered basis, with either two three seats up for election each year held (since 2012) as part of the November general election. The board appoints a superintendent to oversee the day-to-day operation of the district.

References

External links
Rochelle Park Board of Education
 
School Data for the Rochelle Park Board of Education, National Center for Education Statistics

Rochelle Park, New Jersey
New Jersey District Factor Group FG
School districts in Bergen County, New Jersey